Khanyisa is a South African internet personality and recording artist.

Khanyisa may also refer to:

 Khanyisa Mayo, South African soccer player.
 Khanyisa Chawane, South African netball player.
 Khanyisile Litchfield-Tshabalala, former South African navy admiral.
 Khanyisile Motsa, South African humanitarian.